This is a list of rulers of Damascus from ancient times to the present.
General context: History of Damascus.

Aram Damascus
Rezon I (c. 950 BC)
Tabrimmon
Ben-Hadad I (c. 885 BCE–c. 865 BC)
Hadadezer (c. 865 BC–c. 842 BC)
Hazael (c. 842 BC–c. 804 BC)
Ben-Hadad III (c. 796 BC)
Tab-El (c. 770 BC)
Rezon II (c. 740 BC–732 BC)

Period of non-independence
to Assyria (732 BC–609 BC)
Ilu-Ittia (c. 8th century BC)
to Babylon (609 BC–539 BC)
to Persian Achaemenid Empire (539 BC–332 BC)
to Macedon (332 BC–323 BC)
to Antigonids (323 BC–301 BC)
to Ptolemaic Kingdom (301 BC–198 BC)
to Seleucids (198 BC–167 BC)
to Ituraea (167 BC–110 BC) (Semi independent from Seleucids)
to the Decapolis (110 BC–85 BC) (Semi independent from Seleucids)
to Nabataea (85 BC–64 BC)
to the Roman Republic/Roman Empire/Byzantine Empire (64 BC–635)
to the Ghassanids (529–584; ?–635)

Rashidun period
Khalid ibn al-Walid (635–636)
Abu Ubaidah ibn al Jarrah (636–637)
Amr ibn al-Aas (637–640)
Yazid ibn Abi Sufyan (640)
Muawiyah ibn Abu Sufyan (640–661)

Umayyad period
Muawiyah I ibn Abu Sufyan (661–680)
Yazid I ibn Muawiyah (680–683)
Muawiya II ibn Yazid (683–684)
Marwan I ibn Hakam (684–685)
Abd al-Malik ibn Marwan (685–705)
al-Walid I ibn Abd al-Malik (705–715)
Suleiman ibn Abd al-Malik (715–717)
Umar ibn Abd al-Aziz (717–720)
Yazid II ibn Abd al-Malik (720–724)
Hisham ibn Abd al-Malik (724–743)
al-Walid II ibn Yazid II (743–744)
Yazid III ibn al-Walid (744)
Ibrahim ibn al-Walid (744)
Marwan II ibn Muhammad (ruled from Harran in the Jazira, 744–750)

Abbasid period

Abdallah ibn Ali (750–754)
Salih ibn Ali (754)
Abd al-Wahhab ibn Ibrahim ibn Muhammad al-Abbasi (754–764)
Al-Fadl ibn Salih (766–775)
Abu Ja'far Harun al-Rashid (783–786)
Ibrahim ibn as-Salih ibn Ali (c. 785)
Muhammad ibn Ibrahim al-Imam (?–788)
Ibrahim ibn as-Salih ibn Ali (c. 788–791)
Musa ibn Isa (c. 792)
Musa ibn Yahya al-Barmaki (c. 792)
Abd al-Malik ibn Salih (793–795)
Ishaq ibn Isa  ibn Ali (c. 795–?)
Shu'ayb ibn Khazim (802–803)
Ja'far ibn Yahya (803)
Ibrahim ibn Muhammad ibn Ibrahim ibn Muhammad (803–804)
Sulayman ibn al-Mansur (804–805)
Yahya ibn Mu'adh ibn Muslim (c. 806)
Ali ibn al-Hasan ibn Qahtaba (807–809)
Mansur ibn Muhammad al-Mahdi (809–810)
Ahmad ibn Sa'id al-Harashi (810)
Sulayman ibn al-Mansur (810)
Muhammad ibn Salih ibn Bayhas (813–823 or 824/825)
Ma'yuf ibn Yahya ibn Ma'yuf al-Hamdani or Sadaqa ibn Uthman al-Murri (appointed by viceroy Abdallah ibn Tahir al-Khurasani) (825–?)
Abu Ishaq Muhammad ibn Harun al-Rashid (c. 828)
Dinar ibn Abd Allah (c. 839)
Muhammed ibn  al-Jahm  al-Sami (c. 839)
Musa ibn  Ibrahim al Rafiqi (c. 842)
Rija ibn Ayyub al-Hadari (841–847)
Malik ibn Tawk (847–850)
Ibrahim al-Mu'ayyad ibn al-Mutawakkil (850–855)
al-Fath ibn Hakan al-Turki (856–861)
Yunus ibn Tarja  (c. 861)
Isa ibn Muhammad al-Nawshari (861–866)
Salih ibn al-Abbasi al-Turki (c. 866)
Ahmad ibn Khalil al Shaybani (c. 866)
Yamkjur al-Turki (c. 869)
Asram al-Turki (c. 870)
Isa ibn al-Shaykh al-Shaybani, rebel governor (c. 870)
Amajur al-Turki (870–878)

to Tulunid Egypt (877–904)
Ali ibn Amajur al-Turki (878)
Ahmad ibn Wasif
Tughj ibn Juff (896–905)

Abbasid restauration:
Ahmad ibn Kayghalagh (905–906)
al-Rashidi (928–931)
Muhammad ibn Tughj (931–935)

to Ikhshidid Egypt (935–969), except for:
Muhammad Ibn Ra'iq (939–942)
Muhammad ibn Yazdad al-Shahrzuri (943–945)
Sayf al-Dawla (briefly in 945 and 947)

Fatimid emirs
Abu Ali Ja'far ibn Fallah al-Kutami (970–971)

Qarmatian occupation of Damascus
Zalim ibn Mauhab al-Ukayli (973–974)
Jaysh ibn Muhammad (974)
Rayn al-Mu'izzi (974)
Alptakin al-Mu'izzi (975–978)
Qassam al-Turab (978–983)
Fatimid recovery of Damascus
Baltakin al-Turki (983)
Bakjur (983–991)
Ya'qub al-Siqlabi (991)
Manjutakin (993–996)
Sulayman ibn Fallah (996)
Bishara al-Ikhshidi (997–998)
Jaysh ibn Muhammad (998–1000)
Sulayman ibn Fallah (1000–1002)
Abu'l-Hasan Ali ibn Jafar (1002–1004)
Abu Salih Muflih al-Lihyani (1004–1009)
Hamid ibn Mulham (1009)
Wajik ad-Dawlah Abu al-Muta Zu-l-Karnayn Hamdan (1010–1011)
Badr al-Attar (1011–1012)
Abu Abdallah al-Muzahhir (1012–1014)
Abd ar-Rahman ibn Ilyas (1015–1021)
Wajik ad-Dawlah Abu al-Muta Zu-l-Karnayn Hamdan (1021–1023)
Shihab ad-Dawlah Shah Tegin (1023–1024)
Wajik ad-Dawlah Abu al-Muta Zu-l-Karnayn Hamdan (1024–1028)
Anushtakin ad-Dizbari (1028–1041)
Nasir ad-Dawlah al-Hamdani (1041–1048)
Baha ad-Dawlah Takiq al-Saklabi (1048–1049)
Rifq al-Khadim (1049)
Mu'in ad-Dawlah Haydar ibn Adud ad-Dawlah (1049–1058)
Makin ad-Dawlah Abu Ali al-Hasan ibn 'Ali (1058)
Nasir ad-Dawlah al-Hamdani (1058–1060)
Sebuq Tegin (1060)
Muwaffaq ad-Dawlah Jauhar al-Mustansiri (1060–1061)
Hasam ad-Dawlah ibn al-Bachinaki (1061)
Uddat ad-Dawlah ibn al-Husein (1061)
Mu'in ad-Dawlah Haydar ibn Adud ad-Dawla (1061–1063)
Badr al-Jamali (1063)
Hisn ad-Dawlah Haydar ibn Mansur (1063–1067)
Qutb ad-Din Baris Tegin (1068–1069)
Hisn ad-Dawlah Mualla al-Kitami (1069–1071)
Zain ad-Dawlah Intisar ibn Yahya al-Masmudi (1075–1076)

Seljuk emirs
Atsiz ibn Abaq (1076–1079)
Tutush I (1079–1095)
Duqaq, son of Tutush I (1095–1104)
Tutush II, son of Duqaq (1104)
Irtash, son of Tutush I (1104)

Burid emirs
Toghtekin (1104–1128)
Taj al-Muluk Buri (1128–1132)
Shams al-Mulk Isma'il (1132–1135)
Shihab ad-Din Mahmud (1135–1139)
Jamal ad-Din Muhammad (1139–1140)
Mu'in ad-Din Unur (Regent, 1140–1149)
Mujir ad-Din Abaq (1140–1154)

Zengid atabegs
 Nur ad-Din Mahmud (1154–1174)
 As-Salih Ismail al-Malik (1174)

Ayyubid emirs (some were also sultans of Egypt)
 Saladin (1174–1186)
 Al-Afdal (1186–1196), Son of Saladin
 Al-Adil I (1196–1218)
 Al-Mu'azzam (1218–1227)
 An-Nasir Dawud (1227–1229)
 Al-Ashraf (1229–1237)
 As-Salih Ismail (1237)
 Al-Kamil (1237–1238)
 Al-Adil II (1238–1239)
 As-Salih Ayyub (1239)
 As-Salih Ismail (1239–1245)
 As-Salih Ayyub (1245–1249)
 Al-Muazzam Turanshah (1249–1250)
 An-Nasir Yusuf (1250–1260)

Mamluk na'ibs
Sanjar as-Salihi (August/September 1260–October 1260)
Taybars al-Waziri (October 1260–1264)
Aqqush as-Salihi (1264–)
Sunqur al-Ashqar (1279–1280)
Lajin al-Ashqar (1280–?)
Aqush Bey (c. 1290s)
Izz ad-Din Aybak (?–1296)
Shuja ad-Din Adirlu (1296–1297)
Sayf ad-Din Kipchak (1297–1299)
Aqqush al-Afram (1299–1309)
Sayf ad-Din Tanqiz as-Nasiri (1312–1340)
Yilbugha an-Nasiri (1340–1350)
Sayf ad-Din Manjak (1350)
Tash Timur (c. 1380)
Yilbugha al-Nasiri (?–1393)
Sayf ad-Din Tanibak (1393–1399)
Sudun (1399–1400)
occupied by Timur (1400–1401)
Taghribirdi az-Zahiri (1401–?)
Sayf ad-Din Jaqmaq (1418–1420)
Kijmas (c. 1470s)
Ghazali Arab (c. 16th century)
Sibai (c. 16th century)
Shihab ad-Din Ahmad (1516–1517)
Janbirdi al-Ghazali (1518–1521)

Ottoman walis

Yunus Pasha (c. 1516)
Janbirdi al-Ghazali (1518–1521)
Ayas Mehmed Pasha (1521–1522)
Ferhad Pasha (1522–1523)
Hurram Pasha (1523–1525)
Sulayman Pasha al-Tawashi (1525–1526)
Lutf Pasha (1526–1528)
Isa Bey Pasha Chenderli (1528–1531)
Mustafa Ablaq Pasha (1531–1534)
Lutf Pasha (1534–1535)
Isa Bey Pasha Chenderli (1535)
Muhammad Kuzal Pasha (1536–1537)
Topal Sulayman Pasha (1537–1538)
Ahmed Pasha I (1538–1539)
Qese Husrau Pasha (1539–1541)
Isa Pasha (1541–1543)
Piri Pasha (1543–1545)
Sinan Pasha al-Tuwashi (1545–1548)
Piri Pasha (1550–1551)
Muhammad Pasha Bartaki (1551–1552)
Şemsi Pasha (1552–1555)
Hizr Pasha (1555–1561)
Ali Pasha Lankun (1561–1563)
Khusrau Pasha I (1563)
Lala Mustafa Pasha (1563–1569)
Murad Pasha Shaitan (1569)
Ali Pasha Lankun (1569–1570)
Haji Ahmed Pasha (1570–1571)
Darwish Pasha (1571–1574)
Lala Jafar Pasha (1574–1575)
Murad Pasha (1575–1577)
Sokulluzade Hasan Pasha (1577–1581)
Bahram Pasha (1581–1582)
Hüseyin Pasha Boljanić (1582–1583)
Sokulluzade Hasan Pasha (1583)
Qubad Sulayman Pasha (1584)
Üveys Pasha (1584–1585)
Elvendoglu Ali Pasha (October 1585–1586)
Üveys Pasha (1586–1587)
Muhammad Pasha Farhad (1587–1588)
Üveys Pasha (1588–1589)
Elwanzade Ali Pasha (1589–1590)
Koca Sinan Pasha (1590)
Sokulluzade Hasan Pasha (1590–1591)
Mustafa Pasha I (1591–1592)
Khalil Pasha (1592–1593)
Qachirji Mohammad Pasha (1593–1594)
Sokulluzade Hasan Pasha (1594)
Kuyucu Murad Pasha (1594–1595)
Khusrau Pasha II (1595–1596)
Razia Hutunzade Mustafa Pasha (1596–1597)
Yusuf Sinan Pasha (1597–1598)
Ahmed Pasha II (1598)
Ahmed Pasha III (1598)
Khusrau Pasha II (1599)
Emir Mehmed Pasha (1599–1600)
Osman Pasha (1601–1603)
Farhad Pasha Bustanji (1603–1604)
Mustafa Pasha II (1604–1607)
Mahmud Pasha (1607–1608)
Sufi Sinan Pasha (1608–1609)
Ahmad al-Hafiz (1609–1615)
Silihdar Mehmed Pasha (1615–1618)
Ahmad al-Hafiz (1618–1619)
Mustafa Pasha III (1619–1620)
Sulayman Pasha I (1620–1621)
Murtaza Pasha Bustanji (1621–1622)
Mehmed Pasha Rushand (1622–1623)
Mustafa Pasha al-Hannaq (1623–1624)
Nigdeli Mustafa Pasha (1624–1625)
Gurju Mehmed Pasha I (1625–1626)
Tayar Oglu Mehmed Pasha (1626–1628)
Küçük Ahmed Pasha (1628–1629)
Mustafa Pasha IV (1629–1630)
Nawaya Mehmed Pasha (1630–1631)
Ilyas Pasha (1632–1633)
Deli Yusuf Pasha (1633–1635)
Küçük Ahmed Pasha (1635–1636)
Dervish Mehmed Pasha (1636–1638)
Mustafa Pasha IV (1638–1639)
Chifteli Othman Pasha (1639–1640)
Mehmed Pasha I (1640–1641)
Serji Ahmed Pasha (1641–1642)
Melik Ahmed Pasha (1642–1643)
Sultanzade Mehmed Pasha (1643)
Silihdar Yusuf Pasha (1643–1644)
Gurju Mehmed Pasha II (1644–1645)
Ibrahim Pasha I (1645)
Mehmed Pasha Salami (1645–1646)
Gürcê Mehmed (1646)
Silahdar Yusuf Pasha (1646–1647)
Sufi Murteza Pasha (1647)
Sofu Mehmed Pasha (1648)
Ibşir Mustafa Pasha (1649)
Mehmed Pasha II (1649–1650)
Silahdar Murtaza Pasha (1650)
Sivaslı Mustafa Pasha (1650)
Haseki Mehmed Pasha (1650–1652)
Defterzade Mehmed Pasha (1653–1655)
Kara Murat Pasha (1655; died before taking office)
Haseki Mehmed Pasha (1656)
Köprülü Fazıl Ahmed Pasha (1659–1661)
Sulayman Pasha II (1661–1663)
Ribleli Mustafa Pasha (1663–1665)
Salih Pasha I (1665–1666)
Qara Mustafa Pasha (1666–1667)
Mehmed Pasha Chewish Oglu (1667–1669)
Ibrahim Pasha Shaytan (1669–1671)
Abazekh Husein Pasha (1671–1672)
Qara Mehmed Pasha (1672–1673)
Ibrahim Pasha Shushman (1673–1674)
Qer Husein Pasha (1674–1675)
Ibrahim Pasha II (1675–1676)
Bosniak Osman Pasha (1676–1679)
Abazekh Husein Pasha (1679–1683)
Ibrahim Pasha III (1684)
Bosniak Osman Pasha (1684–1685)
Kaplan Pasha (1686–1687)
Arap Salih Pasha (1687–1688)
Hamza Pasha (1688–1689)
Bozoklu Mustafa Pasha (1690)
Murtaza Pasha (1690–1691)
Gurju Mehmed Pasha III (1691–1692)
Çelebi Ismail Pasha (1692–1693)
Ibshir Mustafa Pasha (1693–1694)
Silihdar Osman Pasha (1695–1696)
Silihdar Buuqli Mustafa Pasha (1696–1697)
Ahmad Pasha Hacigirai (1697–1698)
Silihdar Husein Pasha (1699)
Silihdar Hasan Pasha (1700)
Arslan Mehmed Pasha Matracyoghlu (1701)
Salih Agha (1702)
Mehmed Pasha Kurd-Bayram (1702–1703)
Osman Pasha Arnavud (1703)
Arslan Mehmed Pasha Matracyoghlu (1703–1704)
Defterdar Mustafa Pasha (1704)
Firari Hüseyin Pasha (1704–1705)
Mehmed Pasha Kurd-Bayram (1705–1706)
Baltaci Süleyman Pasha (1706–1707)
Yusuf Pasha Qapudan (1707–1708)
Nasuh Pasha al-Aydini (1708–1714)
Topal Yusuf Pasha (1714–1716)
Kapudan Ibrahim Pasha (1716–1717)
Köprülü Abdullah Pasha (1717–1718)
Recep Pasha (1718–1719)
Çerkes Osman Pasha Abu Tawq (1719–1721)
Ali Pasha Maqtuloğlu (1721–1723)
Çerkes Osman Pasha Abu Tawq (1723–1725)
Ismail Pasha al-Azm (1725–November/December 1730)
Muhsinzâde Abdullah Pasha (November/December 1730–December 1730)
Ayndınlı Abdullah Pasha (December 1730–1734)
Sulayman Pasha al-Azm (1734–1738)
Hüseyin Pasha Bostancı (1738–1739)
Muhassıl Osman Pasha (1739–1740)
Abdî Pashazâde Ali Pasha (1740–1741)
Sulayman Pasha al-Azm (1741–1743)
As'ad Pasha al-Azm (1743–1757)
Husayn Pasha ibn Makki (1757–1758)
Çeteci Abdullah Pasha (1758–1759)
Muhammad Pasha al-Shalik (1759–1760)
Uthman Pasha al-Kurji (1760–1771)
Muhammad Pasha al-Azm (1771–1772)
Hafiz Mustafa Pasha Bustanji (1773–1783)
Mehmed Pasha al-Kurji (1783)
Darwish Pasha al-Kurji (1783–1784)
Ahmad Pasha al-Jazzar (1784–1786)
Husayn Pasha Battal (1786–1787)
Abdi Pasha (1787–1788)
Ibrahim Pasha al-Dalati (1788–1789)
Ahmad Pasha al-Jazzar (1790–1795)
Abdullah Pasha al-Azm (1795–1798)
Ahmad Pasha al-Jazzar (1798–1799)
Abdullah Pasha al-Azm (1799–1803)
Ahmad Pasha al-Jazzar (1803–1804)
Abdullah Pasha al-Azm (1804–1807)
Kunj Yusuf Pasha (1807–1810)
Sulayman Pasha al-Adil (1810–1812)
Silahdar Süleyman Pasha (February 1812–May 1816)
Sulayman Pasha al-Adil (1816; interim)
Hafiz Amasyali Ali Pasha (1816–March 1817)
Salih Pasha (March 1817–1817)
Izmirli Süleyman Pasha (1817–1819)
Dervish Mehmed Pasha (1819–1822)
Beylanli Mustafa Pasha (June 1822–April 1823)
Salih Pasha (April 1823–January 1824)
Muftizade Ahmed Pasha (1824–May 1824)
Haci Veliyeddin Pasha (1825–1826)
Hakki Ismail Pasha (October 1826–1827)
Izmirli Haci Salih Pasha (1827–1828)
Mehmed Emin Rauf Pasha (1828–1831)
Mehmed Selim Pasha (1831–1832)
to Egypt, autonomous from the Ottoman Empire
Ahmed Bey (1831–1832)
Ibrahim Pasha (1832)
Muhammad Sharif Pasha al-Kabir (1832–1838)
vacant (1838–1840)
Izzet Mehmed Pasha (1840–1841)
Mehmed Reshid Pasha (1841–1844)
Mehmed Namık Pasha (1845–1846)
Riza Pasha (1845–1846)
Musa Sefveti Pasha (1846)
Namiq Pasha (1848)
Mehmed Namık Pasha (1848–1850)
Osman Pasha Said Pasha (1850–1852)
Izzet Mehmed Pasha (1852)
Açaf Pasha (1852–1854)
Arif Mehmed Pasha (1854–1855)
Mehmed Namık Pasha (1855)
Mahmud Nedim Pasha (1855–1857)
Izzet Ahmed Pasha (1857)
Ali Pasha II (1858)
Mu'amer Pasha (1860)
Mehmed Fuad Pasha (1860–1861)
Ahmed Pasha IV (1861)
Emin Muhlis Pasha (1861–1862)
Mehmed Reshid Pasha (1862–1864)
Müterçim Mehmed Rüstü Pasha (1864–1865)
Reshid Pasha (1865–1871)
Subhi Pasha (1871–1873)
Sherif Mehmed Re'uf Pasha (1873–1874)
Esad Pasha (1874–1875)
Ahmed Hamdi Pasha (1875–1876)
Ahmed Pasha V (1876–1877)
Küçük Ömer Fevzi Pasha (1877–1878)
Midhat Pasha (13 November 1878–1 August 1880)
Hamdi Pasha (1880–1885)
Rashid Nashid Pasha (1885–1888)
Manastirli Mehmed Nazif Pasha (1888–1889)
Mustafa Asim Pasha (1889–1891)
Topal Osman Nuri Pasha (1891–1892)
Sherif Mehmed Rauf Pasha (1892–1894)
Haçi Osman Nuri Pasha (1894–1895)
Hasan Pasha II (1896–1897)
Hüseyin Nâzım Pasha (1897–1906)
Shukri Pasha (1906–1909)
Ismail Fazil Bey (1909–1911)
Ismail Ghalib Bey (1911–1912)
Kiazim Pasha (1912–1913)
Arif Bey (1913)
Mehmed Arif Bey Mardin (1914)
Jamal Pasha (1915)
Azmi Pasha (1915–1916)
Tahsin Bey (1916–1918)
Mehmed Gabriel Pasha (1918)
Shukri Pasha (October 1–2, 1918)

Arab Kingdom of Syria
Faisal (1918–1920)

Capital of Syria

French Syria (1920–1946)
Republic of Syria (1946–1958)
United Arab Republic (1958–1961)
Syrian Arab Republic (1961–present)

See also
 Timeline of Damascus
List of rulers of Aleppo

References

Bibliography

 
Damascus
 
Syria history-related lists
 
Damascus
Damascus